Ruhama is a kibbutz in the Negev desert in southern Israel. The original settlement, established in 1911, is considered the first modern Jewish settlement in the Negev. Located around ten kilometres east of Sderot and surrounded by a nature reserve, it falls under the jurisdiction of the Sha'ar HaNegev Regional Council.

History
Ruhama was first established in 1911, on land purchased in the same year by the "Remnant of Israel" company, set up by Russian Jews in Moscow, under the leadership of Simon Velikovsky, the father of Immanuel Velikovsky, to invest money in Jewish agricultural settlements in the Land of Israel. The name derives from the verse: "And I will have mercy upon her that had not obtained mercy" (Hosea 2:23)". "An artesian well was dug in 1912, and a supply of water was found at a depth of fifty meters." The group also included members of the socialist Zionist movement Hashomer Hatzair. However, the initial settlers were expelled by the Ottoman Empire in 1917; a dilapidated museum building is all that is left of that original settlement.

However, the artesian well prompted the Allied forces under General Allenby to select Ruhama as their headquarters from which the British Army conquered Palestine.

HaShomer used Ruhama as its main forward base along the Gaza-Beersheva line.

Two subsequent attempts to re-establish the settlement during the period of the British Mandate were curtailed by the Arab riots in 1929 and 1936. The kibbutz was eventually successfully re-established in 1944, and grew to a population of 399.

Ruhama uses land from the depopulated Palestinian village of al-Jammama.

The film Sweet Mud (2006) was filmed in Ruhama and Nir Eliyahu.

In 2006, a group of older ideologues blocked an attempt by the younger members of Ruhama to establish a synagogue. In 2012 a synagogue was established in memory of a boy killed in a missile attack near Gaza.

Economy
The economy is based on four agricultural branches: field crops, irrigated cultivation, orchards and henhouses, but many of Ruhama's members work  outside the kibbutz.

Like many kibbutzim, Ruhama went through a process of privatization in the late 1990s.

The kibbutz operated a factory which produced brushes, including toothbrushes, which was closed in July 2019. 

In 1984, Ruhama established a PCB design company.

Ruhama has a full-care center for elderly patients with 25 beds. The center cares for patients suffering from Alzheimer's disease, Parkinson's disease, dementia, paralysis and stroke.

Landmarks
Atar HaRishonim (אתר הראשונים,"Site of the Pioneers"), located just outside the perimeter fence of the kibbutz, marks the place where the early settlers built the first houses and dug a well. Also on show are farming tools used almost 100 years ago.

Notable people

 Recha Frier, a deputy to Zionist leader Henrietta Szold moved to Ruhama in 1947
 Jonathan Roshfeld, MasterChef Israel
 Avi Toledano, Israeli singer

Gallery

References

External links
Ruhama Negev Information Centre

Kibbutzim
Kibbutz Movement
Populated places established in 1911
Populated places established in 1944
1911 establishments in the Ottoman Empire
Populated places in Southern District (Israel)
1929 Palestine riots
Jewish Agency for Israel
Russian-Jewish culture in Israel